Volunteers for Israel (VFI) is an American non-profit organization that volunteers to do civilian work in Israel, open to both Jews and non-Jews. It is most famous for doing civilian work on Israeli Defense Forces bases in partnership with Sar-El. The organization began in 1982, during the 1982 Lebanon War. VFI also partners with Birthright Israel for some of their programs, involving volunteering on the army bases as well as touring the country and getting familiar with Israeli culture and history.

References

Non-profit organizations based in the United States
1982 Lebanon War